The California Tour was a headlining concert tour by American rock band Blink-182 in support of the group's seventh studio album, California (2016). The tour began on July 21, 2016 in San Diego, California and ended on September 22, 2017, in Las Vegas, Nevada. Prior to the tour, the group embarked on the We Are Pirates Tour, performing at several festivals and amphitheaters between May and July 2016. Support acts on the initial, first leg of the California tour included A Day to Remember, and the All-American Rejects and All Time Low on certain dates. A second European tour in mid-2017 included guests Frank Turner, the Front Bottoms, and SWMRS.

The California Tour grossed more than $28.9 million from its first 58 shows with a total attendance of 745,395.

Background
After touring and releasing the band's sixth album Neighborhoods (2011), it became difficult for Blink-182 to record new material, due to guitarist Tom DeLonge's various projects. After disagreements, the remaining members of the group—vocalist/bassist Mark Hoppus and drummer Travis Barker—sought separation from DeLonge and recruited guitarist Matt Skiba, best known as the frontman of rock band Alkaline Trio, in his place. Blink-182 performed two club shows and a slot at the Musink Tattoo Convention & Music Festival in March 2015 with Skiba "filling in" for DeLonge. Afterwards, they regrouped and recorded the album California with producer John Feldmann.

Following the band's first performances with Skiba in 2015, Barker alluded to a potential tour with A Day to Remember, who supported the band on its three initial shows with Skiba in 2015. The tour was first announced on April 28, 2016 on Los Angeles radio station KROQ's Kevin and Bean. After the North American leg was completed, the group played some small shows in Europe, before returning to the States for festival dates in December. Following one-off shows and appearances in early 2017, the band will again tour the U.S. with support acts the Naked and Famous and Wavves. A large European tour commenced in  mid-2017.

Set list
Stats updated as of September 14, 2016.

Main set
 "Feeling This"
 "What's My Age Again?"
 "Family Reunion"
 "The Rock Show"
 "Cynical"
 "First Date"
 "Down"
 "I Miss You"
 "Bored to Death"
 "Built This Pool"
 "Wishing Well" (August 9)
 "Dumpweed"
 "Don't Leave Me" (September 10 and September 17; with Kevin Skaff of A Day to Remember)
 "Always" (July 21)"Reckless Abandon" (July 22–July 26 and August 3–August 20)"Up All Night" (July 28 and July 29)"Man Overboard" (July 30–August 2)"San Diego" (August 21)"Stay Together for the Kids" (August 23–October 1)
 "Stay Together for the Kids" (July 21–August 20)"Reckless Abandon" (August 21–October 1)
 "No Future" (July 21–July 24, August 2, and August 8)"The Only Thing That Matters" (July 26–July 31, August 3, August 5, August 10, August 13, and August 14)"San Diego" (August 6, August 9, August 12, August 14–August 20, August 23–September 28, and October 1)"Stay Together for the Kids" (August 21)"She's Out of Her Mind" (September 29–30, and 2017 Tour)
 "Man Overboard" (July 21–July 28, September 24–September 29, and October 1)"Not Now" (July 29–September 22 and September 30)
 "Violence"
 "Dysentery Gary" (July 21–July 23 and July 26–August 10)"Wendy Clear" (July 24)"Kings of the Weekend" (August 12–August 27 and September 4–October 1)"Don't Leave Me" (August 28)"Josie" (August 30)"Man Overboard" (August 31)"M+M's" (September 2 and September 3)"Sober" (2017 only)
 "Happy Holidays, You Bastard" (July 21–August 2, August 5–August 9, September 8–September 13, and September 17–October 1)"Man Overboard" (August 10)"Dysentery Gary" (August 12–September 4, September 15, and September 16)
 "Kings of the Weekend" (July 21–August 6)"M+M's" (August 8)"Happy Holidays, You Bastard" (August 10–September 4, September 15, and September 16)"Dysentery Gary" (September 8–September 13 and September 17–October 1)
 "Carousel" (July 21–August 13)"Los Angeles" (August 14–October 1)
Encore
 "Los Angeles" (July 21–August 13)"Carousel" (August 14–October 1)
 "All the Small Things"
 "Brohemian Rhapsody"
 "Dammit"
Notes
 "Blow Job" was performed after "Built This Pool" on July 31 and August 3, after "The Only Thing That Matters" on July 29, and after "Los Angeles" on August 5, August 6, and August 10. Performances of the song included the band swapping instruments (Mark Hoppus on lead guitar and vocals, Matt Skiba on drums, and Travis Barker on bass guitar).
 On August 2 after the band played "Los Angeles", Killer Mike was invited to perform a freestyle rap with the band on stage.
 On August 6 and August 8, Mark Hoppus performed a drum solo after "Dammit" to close the show.
 On September 2 in Hartford and September 4 in Saratoga Springs, Travis Barker's son Landon performed a drum solo after "Dammit" to close the show.
 On September 20 in Ridgefield, John Feldmann joined the band to sing "Brohemian Rhapsody".
 On September 29 in Irvine, Steve Aoki played a short DJ set with Travis Barker to open the encore before "Carousel". The duo performed a mashup of Aoki's remix of "Bored to Death", Aoki's song "Delirious (Boneless)", and Kid Cudi's song "Pursuit of Happiness (Nightmare)".

Shows

Canceled shows

Reception
Shows on the California tour were received positively. The Houston Chronicle Joey Guerra considered it "one of the tightest shows this season." Dave Simpson of The Guardian called it a "slick, professional rock show complete with ticker tape, pyrotechnics and lots of hits."

Many reviewers contrasted Skiba with DeLonge; "Skiba barely says a word," noted The Guardian. David Greenwald from the Oregonian felt the show was missing DeLonge's "wonderfully whiny voice [and] the easy camaraderie he and Hoppus once shared." The Pittsburgh Post-Gazette Scott Mervis wrote that "there was clearly something missing from the Blink experience. Every major band has its thing, and Blink's is being the whiny pop-punk trio with the obnoxious, profane interplay." "The new Blink feels like a whole new band altogether – not definitively better, not definitively worse, but definitively not the same," wrote Jay Cridlin of the Tampa Bay Times. A couple reviewers considered Skiba an improvement. Case Keefer of the Las Vegas Sun wrote that "the live show was noticeably improved with Skiba's soothing voice and raging effort."

Many praised Barker's drumming ability; "a truly dizzying drummer and an otherwise silent enigma," Greenwald wrote, while Simpson dubbed him "the glue holding everything together [...] a joy to watch." Among the more negative reviews came from Kevin Williams at the Chicago Tribune, who reviewed the band's Lollapalooza set. Williams commented that "This by-the-numbers set can make an eloquent argument that old punkers should just fade away ... [they] feel like a tribute band."

References

Notes

Citations

External links
 

2016 concert tours
2017 concert tours
Blink-182 concert tours